Indigenous Australians are people with familial heritage from, and membership in, the ethnic groups that lived in areas within the Australian continent before British colonisation. They consist of two distinct groups: the Aboriginal peoples of the Australian mainland and Tasmania, and the Torres Strait Islander peoples from the seas between Queensland and Papua New Guinea. The term Aboriginal and Torres Strait Islander peoples or the person's specific cultural group, is often preferred, though the terms First Nations of Australia, First Peoples of Australia and First Australians are also increasingly common; 812,728 people self-identified as being of Aboriginal and/or Torres Strait Islander origin in the 2021 Australian Census, representing 3.2% of the total population of Australia. Of these Indigenous Australians, 91.4% identified as Aboriginal; 4.2% identified as Torres Strait Islander; while 4.4% identified with both groups. Since 1995, the Australian Aboriginal flag and the Torres Strait Islander flag have been official flags of Australia.

The time of arrival of the first human beings in Australia is a matter of debate and ongoing investigation. The earliest conclusively human remains found in Australia are those of Mungo Man LM3 and Mungo Lady, which have been dated to around 50,000 years BP. Although, Indigenous Australians have most likely been living in Australia for upwards of 60,000 years.   Isolated for millennia by rising sea water after the last Ice Age, Australian Aboriginal peoples developed a variety of regional cultures and languages, invented distinct artistic and religious traditions, and affected the environment of the continent in a number of ways through hunting, fire farming, and the introduction of the dog. Technologies for warfare and hunting like the boomerang and spear were constructed of natural materials, as were musical instruments like the didgeridoo.

Although there are a number of cultural commonalities among Indigenous Australians, there is also a great diversity among different communities. The 2022 Australian census recorded 167 Aboriginal and Torres Strait Islander languages used at home by some 76,978 Aboriginal and Torres Strait Islander peoples. At the time of European colonisation, it is estimated that there were over 250 Aboriginal languages. It is now estimated that all but 13 remaining Indigenous languages are considered endangered. Aboriginal people today mostly speak English, with Aboriginal phrases and words being added to create Australian Aboriginal English (which also has a tangible influence of Indigenous languages in the phonology and grammatical structure). Around three quarters of Australian place names are of Aboriginal origin.

The Indigenous population prior to European settlement was scarce, with estimates ranging widely from 318,000 to 1,000,000 in total, with the distribution being similar to that of the current Australian population, the majority living in the south-east, centred along the Murray River. The First Fleet of British settlers arrived on instructions to "live in amity and kindness" with the Aboriginal population. Nevertheless, a population collapse principally from disease followed European colonisation, beginning with a smallpox epidemic spreading three years after the arrival of Europeans. Massacres and frontier conflicts involving European settlers also contributed to depopulation. From the 19th to the mid-20th century, government policy removed many mixed heritage children from Aboriginal communities, which was judged "genocidal" in the Bringing Them Home Report (1997).

Terminology

Variations
There are a number of appropriate terms to use when referring to Aboriginal peoples of Australia, but there is general agreement that it is important to respect the "preferences of individuals, families, or communities, and allow them to define what they are most comfortable with" when referring to Aboriginal people.

The word 'aboriginal' has been in the English language since at least the 16th century to mean "first or earliest known, indigenous". It comes from the Latin ab (from) and origo (origin, beginning). The term was used in Australia to describe its Aboriginal peoples as early as 1789. It became capitalised and was employed as the common name to refer to both Aboriginal and Torres Strait Islanders, although today the latter are not included in the term. The term "Aborigine" (as opposed to "Aboriginal") is disfavoured, being regarded as having colonialist connotations.

While the term "Indigenous Australians" has grown in popularity since the 1980s, many Aboriginal and Torres Strait Islander peoples dislike it, feeling that it is too generic and removes their identity. However, many people find the term useful and convenient, and it can be used where appropriate.

In recent years, "First Nations", "First Peoples" and "First Australians" have become more common.

Being as specific as possible, for example naming the language group (such as Arrernte), demonym relating to geographic area (such as Nunga), is considered best practice and most respectful.

Terms "Black" and "Blackfella" 

The term "Black" has been used to refer to Aboriginal Australians since European colonisation. While originally related to skin colour and often used pejoratively, the term is used today to indicate Aboriginal heritage or culture in general and refers to any people of such heritage regardless of their level of skin pigmentation. In the 1970s, many Aboriginal activists, such as Gary Foley, proudly embraced the term "Black", and writer Kevin Gilbert's book from the time was entitled Living Black. The book included interviews with several members of the Aboriginal community, including Robert Jabanungga, reflecting on contemporary Aboriginal culture. Use of this term varies depending on context and its use needs care as it may be deemed inappropriate. The term "Black" has sometimes caused confusion with African immigrants.

Living Black is an Australian news and current affairs program covering "issues affecting Aboriginal and Torres Strait Islander Australians". It is presented and produced by Karla Grant, an Arrernte woman.

A significant number of Aboriginal and Torres Strait Islander people use the term "Blackfella" and its associated forms to refer to Aboriginal Australians.

Blak culture
Contemporary Aboriginal arts are sometimes referred to as a "Blak" arts movement, reflected in names such as BlakDance, BlakLash Collective, the title of Thelma Plum's song and album, Better in Blak, the Blak & Bright literary festival in Melbourne, Blak Dot Gallery, Blak Markets and Blak Cabaret.

The use of blak is part of a wider social movement (as seen in terms such as "Blaktivism" and "Blak History Month"), after the term was coined in 1991 by photographer and multimedia artist Destiny Deacon, in an exhibition entitled Blak lik mi. Using a spelling possibly appropriated from American hip hop or rap, the intention behind it is that it "reclaim[s] historical, representational, symbolical, stereotypical and romanticised notions of Black or Blackness", and expresses taking back power and control within a society that does not give its Indigenous peoples much opportunity for self-determination as individuals and communities. Deacon herself said that it was "taking on the 'colonisers' language and flipping it on its head", as an expression of authentic urban Aboriginal identity.

Regional groups

Aboriginal groups

Aboriginal peoples of Australia are the various peoples indigenous to mainland Australia and associated islands, excluding the Torres Strait Islands.

The broad term Aboriginal Australians includes many regional groups that may be identified under names based on local language, locality, or what they are called by neighbouring groups. Some communities, cultures or groups may be inclusive of others and alter or overlap; significant changes have occurred in the generations after colonisation. The word "community" is often used to describe groups identifying by kinship, language or belonging to a particular place or "country". A community may draw on separate cultural values and individuals can conceivably belong to a number of communities within Australia; identification within them may be adopted or rejected. An individual community may identify itself by many names, each of which can have alternative English spellings.

The naming of peoples is complex and multi-layered, but a few examples are Anangu in northern South Australia, and neighbouring parts of Western Australia and Northern Territory; Arrernte in central Australia; Koori (or Koorie) in New South Wales and Victoria (Aboriginal Victorians); Goorie (variant pronunciation and spelling of Koori) in South East Queensland and some parts of northern New South Wales; Murri used in parts of Queensland and northern New South Wales where specific collective names are not used; Tiwi people of the Tiwi Islands off Northern Territory; and Palawah in Tasmania. The largest Aboriginal communities – the Pitjantjatjara, the Arrernte, the Luritja and the Warlpiri – are all from Central Australia.

Throughout the history of the continent, there have been many different Aboriginal groups, each with its own individual language, culture, and belief structure. At the time of British settlement, there were over 200 distinct languages.

The Tasmanian Aboriginal population are thought to have first crossed into Tasmania approximately 40,000 years ago via a land bridge between the island and the rest of mainland Australia during the last glacial period. Estimates of the population of the Aboriginal people of Tasmania, before European arrival, are in the range of 3,000 to 15,000 people although genetic studies have suggested significantly higher figures, which are supported by Indigenous oral traditions that indicate a reduction in population from diseases introduced by British and American sealers before settlement. The original population was further reduced to around 300 between 1803 and 1833 due to disease, warfare and other actions of British settlers. Despite over 170 years of debate over who or what was responsible for this near-extinction, no consensus exists on its origins, process, or whether or not it was genocide. However, according to Benjamin Madley, using the "UN definition, sufficient evidence exists to designate the Tasmanian catastrophe genocide". A woman named Trugernanner (often rendered as Truganini) who died in 1876, was, and still is, widely believed to be the last of the "full-blooded" Tasmanian Aboriginal people. However, in 1889 Parliament recognised Fanny Cochrane Smith (d. 1905) as the last surviving "full-blooded" Tasmanian Aboriginal person.

The 2016 census reported 23,572 Indigenous Australians in the state of Tasmania.

Torres Strait Islanders 

The Torres Strait Islander people possess a heritage and cultural history distinct from Aboriginal traditions. The eastern Torres Strait Islanders in particular are related to the Papuan peoples of New Guinea, and speak a Papuan language. Accordingly, they are not generally included under the designation "Aboriginal Australians". This has been another factor in the promotion of the more inclusive term "Indigenous Australians". Six percent of Indigenous Australians identify themselves fully as Torres Strait Islanders. A further 4% of Indigenous Australians identify themselves as having both Torres Strait Islander and Aboriginal heritage.

The Torres Strait Islands comprise over 100 islands which were annexed by Queensland in 1879. Many Indigenous organisations incorporate the phrase "Aboriginal and Torres Strait Islander" to highlight the distinctiveness and importance of Torres Strait Islanders in Australia's Indigenous population.

Eddie Mabo was from "Mer" or Murray Island in the Torres Strait, which the famous Mabo decision of 1992 involved.

Other groupings

Aboriginal and Torres Strait Islander people also sometimes refer to themselves by descriptions which relate to their ecological environment, such as saltwater people for coast-dwellers (including Torres Strait Islander people), freshwater people, rainforest people, desert people, or spinifex people, (the latter referring to the Pila Nguru of Western Australia).

History

Migration to Australia

Aboriginal peoples

Several settlements of humans in Australia have been dated around 49,000 years ago. Luminescence dating of sediments surrounding stone artefacts at Madjedbebe, a rock shelter in northern Australia, indicates human activity at 65,000 years BP. Genetic studies appear to support an arrival date of 50–70,000 years ago.

The earliest anatomically modern human remains found in Australia (and outside of Africa) are those of Mungo Man; they have been dated at 42,000 years old. The initial comparison of the mitochondrial DNA from the skeleton known as Lake Mungo 3 (LM3) with that of ancient and modern Aboriginal peoples indicated that Mungo Man is not related to Australian Aboriginal peoples. However, these findings have been met with a general lack of acceptance in scientific communities. The sequence has been criticised as there has been no independent testing, and it has been suggested that the results may be due to posthumous modification and thermal degradation of the DNA. Although the contested results seem to indicate that Mungo Man may have been an extinct subspecies that diverged before the most recent common ancestor of contemporary humans, the administrative body for the Mungo National Park believes that present-day local Aboriginal peoples are descended from the Lake Mungo remains. Independent DNA testing is unlikely as the Indigenous custodians are not expected to allow further invasive investigations.

It is generally believed that Aboriginal people are the descendants of a single migration into the continent, a people that split from the ancestors of East Asians. Recent work with mitochondrial DNA suggests a founder population of between 1,000 and 3,000 women to produce the genetic diversity observed, which suggests that "initial colonisation of the continent would have required deliberate organised sea travel, involving hundreds of people". Aboriginal people seem to have lived a long time in the same environment as the now extinct Australian megafauna.

Some evidence from the analysis of charcoal and artefacts revealing human use suggests a date as early as 65,000 BP. Luminescence dating has suggested habitation in Arnhem Land as far back as 60,000 years BP. Evidence of fires in South-West Victoria suggest "human presence in Australia 120,000 years ago", although more research is required.

Genetics 

Genetic studies have revealed that Aboriginal Australians largely descended from a population wave associated with an Eastern Eurasian meta-population, and are most closely related to other Oceanians, such as Melanesians. The Aboriginal Australians also show affinity to other Australasian populations, such as Negritos or Ancient Ancestral South Indians groups, such as the Andamanese people, as well as to East Asian peoples. Phylogenetic data suggests that an early initial eastern non-African (ENA) or East-Eurasian meta-population trifurcated, and gave rise to Australasians (Oceanians), the Ancient Ancestral South Indians/Andamanese, and the East/Southeast Asian lineage including the ancestors of Native Americans,  although Oceanians, specifically Papuans and Aboriginal Australians, may have also received some geneflow from an earlier group (xOOA) as well, around 2%, next to additional archaic admixture in the Sahul region.

Rasmussen et al 2011 shows that Aboriginal Australian have a lower proportion of European alleles compared to Asians, which they believe is indicative of a multiple dispersal model.  Genetically, while Aboriginal Australians are most closely related to Melanesian and Papuan people, McEvoy et al 2010  believed there is also another component that could indicate Ancient Ancestral South Indian admixture or more recent European influence. Research indicates a single founding Sahul group with subsequent isolation between regional populations which were relatively unaffected by later migrations from the Asian mainland, which may have introduced the dingo 4–5,000 years ago. The research also suggests a divergence from the Papuan people of New Guinea and the Mamanwa people of the Philippines about 32,000 years ago, with a rapid population expansion about 5,000 years ago. A 2011 genetic study found evidence that the Aboriginal, Papuan and Mamanwa peoples carry some of the alleles associated with the Denisovan peoples of Asia, (not found amongst populations in mainland Asia) suggesting that modern and archaic humans interbred in Asia approximately 44,000 years ago, before Australia separated from New Guinea and the migration to Australia. A 2012 paper reports that there is also evidence of a substantial genetic flow from India to northern Australia estimated at slightly over four thousand years ago, a time when changes in tool technology and food processing appear in the Australian archaeological record, suggesting that these may be related.

Aboriginal Australian men have Haplogroup C-M347 in high frequencies with peak estimates ranging from 60.2% to 68.7%. In addition, the basal form K2* (K-M526) of the extremely ancient Haplogroup K2 – whose subclades Haplogroup R, haplogroup Q, haplogroup M and haplogroup S can be found in the majority of Europeans, Northern South Asians, Native Americans and the Indigenous peoples of Oceania – has only been found in living humans today amongst Aboriginal Australians. 27% of them may carry K2* and approximately 29% of Aboriginal Australian males belong to subclades of K2b1, a.k.a. M and S.

Aboriginal Australians possess deep rooted clades of both mtDNA Haplogroup M and Haplogroup N.

Torres Strait Islands
Although it is estimated that people migrated from the Indonesian archipelago and New Guinea to mainland Australia about 70,000 years ago,
 evidence of human settlement in the Torres Strait has only been uncovered by archaeologists dating back to about 2500 years ago.

Before European contact

Aboriginal people

Aboriginal people in some regions lived as foragers and hunter-gatherers, hunting and foraging for food from the land. Although Aboriginal society was generally mobile, or semi-nomadic, moving according to the changing food availability found across different areas as seasons changed, the mode of life and material cultures varied greatly from region to region, and there were permanent settlements and agriculture in some areas. The greatest population density was to be found in the southern and eastern regions of the continent, the River Murray valley in particular. Canoes were made out of bark for use on the Murray.

There is some evidence that, before outside contact, some groups of Aboriginal Australians had a complex subsistence system with elements of agriculture, that was only recorded by the very first of European explorers. One early settler took notes on the life styles of the Wathaurung people whom he lived near in Victoria. He saw women harvesting Murnong tubers, a native yam that is now almost extinct.  However, the area that they were harvesting from was already cleared of other plants, making it easier to harvest Murnong (also known as yam daisy) exclusively.

Along the northern coast of Australia, parsnip yams were harvested by leaving the bottom part of the yam still stuck in the ground so that it would grow again in the same spot. Similar to many other farmers in the world, Aboriginal peoples used slash and burn techniques to enrich the nutrients of their soil. However, sheep and cattle later brought over by Europeans would ruin this soil by trampling on it. To add on the complexity of Aboriginal farming techniques, farmers deliberately exchanged seeds to begin growing plants where they did not naturally occur. In fact there were so many examples of Aboriginal Australians managing farm land in a complex manner that Australian Anthropologist, Dr. Norman Tindale was able to draw an Aboriginal grain belt, detailing the specific areas where crops were once produced.

In terms of aquaculture, explorer Thomas Mitchell noted large stone fish traps on the Darling River at Brewarrina.  Each trap covers a pool, herding fish through a small entrance that would later be shut.  Traps were created at different heights to accommodate different water levels during floods and droughts.

Technology used by Indigenous Australian societies before European contact included weapons, tools, shelters, watercraft, and the message stick. Weapons included boomerangs, spears (sometimes thrown with a woomera) with stone or fishbone tips, clubs, and (less commonly) axes. The Stone Age tools available included knives with ground edges, grinding devices, and eating containers. Fibrecraft was well-developed, and fibre nets, baskets, and bags were used for fishing, hunting, and carrying liquids. Trade networks spanned the continent, and transportation included canoes. Shelters varied regionally, and included wiltjas in the Atherton Tablelands, paperbark and stringybark sheets and raised platforms in Arnhem Land, whalebone huts in what is now South Australia, stone shelters in what is now western Victoria, and a multi-room pole and bark structure found in Corranderrk. A bark tent or lean-to is known as a humpy, gunyah, or wurley. Clothing included the possum-skin cloak in the southeast and riji (pearl shells) in the northeast.

There is evidence that some Aboriginal populations in northern Australia regularly traded with Makassan fishermen from Indonesia before the arrival of Europeans.

At the time of first European contact, it is generally estimated that the pre-1788 population was 314,000, while recent archaeological finds suggest that a population of 500,000 to 750,000 could have been sustained, with some ecologists estimating that a population of up to a million or even two million people was possible.
More recent work suggests that Aboriginal populations exceeded 1.2 million 500 years ago, but may have fallen somewhat with the introduction of disease pathogens from Eurasia in the last 500 years. The population was split into 250 individual nations, many of which were in alliance with one another, and within each nation there existed separate, often related clans, from as few as 5 or 6 to as many as 30 or 40. Each nation had its own language, and a few had several.

There is some evidence to suggest that the section of the Australian continent now occupied by Queensland was the single most densely populated area of pre-contact Australia. There are also signs that the population density of Aboriginal Australia was comparatively higher in the north-eastern sections of New South Wales, and along the northern coast from the Gulf of Carpentaria and westward including certain sections of Northern Territory and Western Australia.

Torres Strait Island people
The Torres Strait peoples' fishing economy relied on boats, which they built themselves. There is also evidence of the construction of large, complex buildings on stilts and domed structures using bamboo, with thatched roofs, which catered for extended family members living together.

British colonisation

First contact

British exploration of the Australian coastline began with the buccaneer William Dampier in 1688 and 1699. Dampier was impressed neither by the country nor the people of the west Australian coast. Almost a century later, the explorer James Cook mapped the east coast of Australia and claimed the territory for Britain in the name of King George III. Cook was impressed both by the land and the people whom he encountered, writing in his journal: "From what I have said of the Natives of New Holland they may appear to some to be the most wretched people upon Earth, but in reality they are far more happier than we Europeans; being wholy unacquainted not only with the superfluous but the necessary conveniencies so much sought after in Europe, they are happy in not knowing the use of them. They live in a Tranquillity which is not disturb'd by the Inequality of Condition".

Nevertheless, Cook also noted in his journal two men at Botany Bay who "seem'd resolved to oppose" his first landing. According to Cook, after one of the men threw a rock, Cook fired a musquet loaded with small shott, which struck him with little effect. Some shott was lodged into one of the men's shields and was taken back to England by Cook, where it remains in the British Museum.

Cook spent a greater period of time among the Guugu Yimithirr people around modern Cooktown in Queensland, where his ship was nearly wrecked on the Great Barrier Reef. Here relations were generally amicable and Cook recorded words from their language including "kangaroo", though a fight broke out when the British took turtles from the river without sharing them. Peace was restored when an elder presented Cook with a broken-tipped spear as a peace offering – remembered as a first "act of reconciliation". The encounter is commemorated annually by the Guugu Yimithirr to this day.

Cook's favourable impression of the East Coast of Australia led directly to the commencement of the British colonisation of Australia, commencing at Sydney in 1788. The First Fleet of British ships was commanded by Governor Arthur Phillip, who had been instructed to "endeavour by every possible means to open an intercourse with the natives, and to conciliate their affections", and to enjoin his British subjects to "live in amity and kindness with them" so as "to cultivate an acquaintance with them without their having an idea of our great superiority over them".

Dates by area

British colonisation of Australia began with the arrival of the First Fleet in Botany Bay, New South Wales, in 1788. Settlements were subsequently established in Tasmania (1803), Victoria (1803), Queensland (1824), Western Australia (1826), and the Colony of South Australia (1836).

The first settlement in the Northern Territory was built after Captain Gordon Bremer took possession of the Tiwi Islands of Bathurst and Melville, claiming them for the colony of New South Wales, although that settlement failed after a few years, along with a couple of later attempts; permanent settlement was only finally achieved at Darwin in 1869.

Australia was the exception to British imperial colonisation practices, in that no treaty was drawn up setting out terms of agreement between the settlers and native proprietors, as was the case in North America, and New Zealand. Many of the men on the First Fleet had had military experience among Native American tribes in North America, and tended to attribute to the Aboriginal people alien and misleading systems or concepts like chieftainship and tribe with which they had become acquainted in the northern hemisphere.

British administrative control began in the Torres Strait Islands in 1862, with the appointment of John Jardine, police magistrate at Rockhampton, as Government Resident in the Torres Straits. He originally established a small settlement on Albany Island, but on 1 August 1864 he went to Somerset Island. English missionaries arrived on Erub (Darnley Island) on 1 July 1871. In 1872 the boundary of Queensland was extended to include Thursday Island and some other islands in Torres Strait within  of the Queensland coast, and in 1879 Queensland annexed the other islands, which became part of the British colony of Queensland.

Impact
One immediate consequence was a series of epidemics of European diseases such as measles, smallpox and tuberculosis. In the 19th century, smallpox was the principal cause of Aboriginal deaths, and vaccinations of the "native inhabitants" had begun in earnest by the 1840s. This smallpox epidemic in 1789 is estimated to have killed up to 90% of the Darug people. The cause of the outbreak is disputed. Some scholars have attributed it to European settlers, but it is also argued that Macassan fishermen from South Sulawesi and nearby islands may have introduced smallpox to Australia before the arrival of Europeans. A third suggestion is that the outbreak was caused by contact with members of the First Fleet. A fourth theory is that the epidemic was of chickenpox, not smallpox, carried by members of the First Fleet, and to which the Aboriginal people also had no immunity. Moreover, Aboriginal people were infected with sexually transmitted infections, especially syphilis and gonorrhea.

Another consequence of British colonisation was European seizure of land and water resources, with the decimation of kangaroo and other food sources which continued throughout the 19th and early 20th centuries as rural lands were converted for sheep and cattle grazing. Settlers also participated in the rape and forcible prostitution of Aboriginal women.

Some Europeans, for example escaped convicts, lived in Aboriginal and Torres Strait Islander communities.

In 1834 there occurred the first recorded use of Aboriginal trackers, who proved very adept at navigating their way through the Australian landscape and finding people.

During the 1860s, Tasmanian Aboriginal skulls were particularly sought internationally for studies into craniofacial anthropometry. The skeleton of Truganini, a Tasmanian Aboriginal who died in 1876, was exhumed within two years of her death despite her pleas to the contrary by the Royal Society of Tasmania, and later placed on display. Campaigns continue to have Aboriginal body parts returned to Australia for burial; Truganini's body was returned in 1976 and cremated, and her ashes were scattered according to her wishes.

Place names sometimes reveal discrimination, such as Mount Jim Crow in Rockhampton, Queensland (now Mount Baga), as well as racist policies, like Brisbane's Boundary Streets, which used to indicate boundaries where Aboriginal people were not allowed to cross during certain times of the day. There is ongoing discussion about changing many of these names.

Throughout most of the 19th and 20th centuries, Aboriginal and Torres Strait Islander people had their lives under the jurisdiction of various state-based protection laws. These Acts of Parliament appointed Protectors of Aborigines and Aboriginal Protection Boards, whose role was to control the lives of Indigenous Australians. Wages were controlled by the Protectors, and Indigenous Australians received less income than their non-Indigenous counterparts in employment.

During this time, many Aboriginal people were victims of slavery by colonists alongside Pacific Islander peoples who were kidnapped from their homes, in a practice known as blackbirding. Between 1860 and 1970, under the guise of protectionist policies, people, including children as young as 12, were forced to work on properties where they worked under horrific conditions and most did not receive any wages. In the pearling industry, Aboriginal peoples were bought for about 5 pounds, with pregnant Aboriginal women "prized because their lungs were believed to have greater air capacity". Aboriginal prisoners in the Aboriginal-only prison on Rottnest Island, many of whom were there on trumped up charges, were chained up and forced to work. In 1971, 373 Aboriginal men were found buried in unmarked graves on the island. Up until June 2018, the former prison was being used as holiday accommodation.

From 1810, Aboriginal peoples were moved onto mission stations, run by churches and the state. After this period of protectionist policies that aimed to segregate and control Aboriginal populations, in 1937 the Commonwealth government agreed to move towards assimilation policies. These policies aimed to integrate Aboriginal persons who were "not of full blood" into the white community in an effort to eliminate the "Aboriginal problem". As part of this, there was an increase in the number of children forcibly removed from their homes and placed with white people, either in institutions or foster homes.

Frontier wars and massacres

As part of the colonisation process, there were many conflicts and clashes between colonists and Aboriginal and Torres Strait Islander people across the continent and islands. In Queensland, the killing of Aboriginal peoples was largely perpetrated by civilian "hunting" parties and the Native Police, armed groups of Aboriginal men who were recruited at gunpoint and led by government officers to eliminate Aboriginal resistance. There is evidence that massacres of Aboriginal and Torres Strait Islander peoples, which began with arrival of British colonists, continued until the 1930s. Researchers at the University of Newcastle under Lyndall Ryan have been mapping the massacres.   they have mapped almost 500 places where massacres happened, with 12,361 Aboriginal people killed and 204 Colonists killed, numbering at least 311 massacres over a period of about 140 years. After losing a significant number of their social unit in one blow, the survivors were left very vulnerable – with reduced ability to gather food, reproduce, or fulfill their ceremonial obligations, as well as defend themselves against further attack.

Estimating the total number of deaths during the frontier wars is difficult due to lack of records and the fact that many massacres of Aboriginal and Torres Strait Islander were kept secret. It is often quoted that 20,000 Aboriginal Australians and 2000 colonists died in the frontier wars; however, recent research indicates at least 40,000 Aboriginal dead and 2,000 to 2,500 settlers dead. Other research indicates a minimum of 65,000 Aboriginal peoples may have been killed in Queensland alone.

There have been arguments over whether deaths of Aboriginal peoples, particularly in Tasmania, as well as the forcible removal of children from Aboriginal communities, constitutes genocide. 
There has been broad range of historical research on the massacres and treatment of Aboriginal peoples, including by Lyndall Ryan at the Centre for 21st Century Humanities, the Frontier Conflict Database, and the Australian Commonwealth government's Human Rights and Equal Opportunity Commission (HREOC) Report of the National Inquiry into the Separation of Aboriginal and Torres Strait Islander Children From their Families. 

According to the analysis of Justice Ronald Wilson in the Human Rights and Equal Opportunity Report Australia's policy of forcible removal was genocidal in nature. Quoting Raphael Lemkin, Wilson defined genocide as "a coordinated plan of different actions aimed at the destruction of the essential foundations of the lives of national groups, with the aim of annihilating the groups themselves." The objectives of which were "the disintegration of the political and social institutions, of culture, language, national feelings, religion, and the economic existence of national groups, the destruction of personal security, liberty, health, dignity, and even the lives of the individuals belonging to such groups."

Wilson states that "Genocide can be committed by means other than actual physical extermination. It is committed by the forcible transfer of children, provided the other elements of the crime are established." He points out that "Genocide is committed even when the destruction has not been carried out. A conspiracy to commit genocide and an attempt at genocide are both crimes which are committed whether or not any actual destruction occurred." Further, Wilson found that "The debates at the time of the drafting of the Genocide Convention establish clearly that an act or policy is still genocidal when it is motivated by a number of objectives. To constitute an act of genocide the planned extermination of a group need not be solely motivated by animosity or hatred."...and that "reasonable foreseeability...is sufficient to establish the Convention's intent element." He concluded that "The policy of forcible removal of children from Indigenous Australians to other groups for the purpose of raising them separately from and ignorant of their culture and people could properly be labelled 'genocidal' in breach of binding international law from at least 11 December 1946...The practice continued for almost another quarter of a century."

Unlike the forcible removal of Indigenous children, the massacres perpetrated from the early colonial period were accompanied by the society wide acknowledgement, and at times, vehement advocacy for extermination of Indigenous peoples. There are many examples of politicians, bureaucrats, newspaper editors and ordinary people advocating the desirability and inevitability of the extirpation, annihilation or extermination of Aboriginal Peoples.

There are few memorials in Australia acknowledging the widespread massacres of Aboriginal Peoples, and no memorials describing it as genocide. However, the massacres were often recorded by Australians  as place names, for example: Murdering Gully in Newcastle, Murdering Creek at Lake Weyba, Skull Pocket and Skeleton Creek near Cairns, Rifle Creek near Mt Molloy Qld, Skull Lagoon near Mt Carbine Qld, Skull Hole near Winton Qld, Battle Camp Road, Range and Station east of Laura Qld, Slaughterhouse Creek (Waterloo Creek) NSW.

Political resistance
There has always been Aboriginal and Torres Strait Islander resistance, from the arrival of colonists through to the present.
 In 1938, over 100 Aboriginal peoples protested one of the first Australia Day celebrations by gathering for an "Aborigines Conference" in Sydney and marking the day as the "Day of Protest and Mourning"; the day is now often referred to as "Survival Day" or "Invasion Day" by Indigenous peoples.
 In 1963 the Yolngu people of Yirrkala in Arnhem Land sent two bark petitions to the Australian government to protest the granting of mining rights on their lands. The Yirrkala Bark petitions were traditional Aboriginal documents to be recognised under Commonwealth law.
 On Australia day in 1972, 34 years after the first "Day of Protest and Mourning", Indigenous activists set up the Aboriginal Tent Embassy on the lawn of Old Parliament House to protest the state of Aboriginal land rights. The Tent Embassy was given heritage status in 1995, and celebrated its 40th anniversary in 2012, making it the longest, unanswered protest camp in the world.

1871–1969: Stolen Generations

The term Stolen Generations refers to those children of Australian Aboriginal and Torres Strait Islander descent who were forcibly removed from their families by the Australian Federal and State government agencies and church missions for the purpose of eradicating Aboriginal culture, under acts of their respective parliaments. The forcible removal of these children occurred in the period between approximately 1871 and 1969, although, in some places, children were still being taken in the 1970s.

Early 20th century
By 1900, the recorded Indigenous population of Australia had declined to approximately 93,000. However, this was only a partial count, as both Aboriginal people and Torres Strait Islanders were poorly covered, with desert Aboriginal peoples not counted at all until the 1930s. During the first half of the twentieth century, many Indigenous Australians worked as stockmen on sheep stations and cattle stations for extremely low wages. The Indigenous population continued to decline, reaching a low of 74,000 in 1933 before numbers began to recover. By 1995, population numbers had reached pre-colonisation levels, and in 2010 there were around 563,000 Indigenous Australians.

Although, as British subjects, all Indigenous Australians were nominally entitled to vote, generally only those who merged into mainstream society did so. Only Western Australia and Queensland specifically excluded Aboriginal and Torres Strait Islander people from the electoral rolls. Despite the Commonwealth Franchise Act 1902, which excluded "Aboriginal natives of Australia, Asia, Africa and Pacific Islands except New Zealand" from voting unless they were on the roll before 1901, South Australia insisted that all voters enfranchised within its borders would remain eligible to vote in the Commonwealth, and Aboriginal and Torres Strait Islander people continued to be added to their rolls, albeit haphazardly.

Despite efforts to bar their enlistment, over 1,000 Indigenous Australians fought for Australia in the First World War.

1934 saw the first appeal to the High Court by an Aboriginal Australian, and it succeeded. Dhakiyarr was found to have been wrongly convicted of the murder of a white policeman, for which he had been sentenced to death; the case focused national attention on Aboriginal rights issues. Dhakiyarr disappeared upon release. In 1938, the 150th anniversary of the arrival of the British First Fleet was marked as a Day of Mourning and Protest at an Aboriginal meeting in Sydney, and has since become marked around Australia as "Invasion Day" or "Survival Day" by Aboriginal protesters and their supporters.

Hundreds of Indigenous Australians served in the Australian armed forces during World War Two – including with the Torres Strait Light Infantry Battalion and The Northern Territory Special Reconnaissance Unit, which were established to guard Australia's North against the threat of Japanese invasion. However, most were denied pension rights and military allotments, except in Victoria, where each case was judged individually, without a blanket denial of rights accruing from their service.

Late 20th century

The 1960s was a pivotal decade in the assertion of Aboriginal rights and a time of growing collaboration between Aboriginal activists and white Australian activists. In 1962, Commonwealth legislation specifically gave Aboriginal people the right to vote in Commonwealth elections. A group of University of Sydney students organised a bus tour of western and coastal New South Wales towns in 1965 to raise awareness of the state of Aboriginal health and living conditions. This Freedom Ride also aimed to highlight the social discrimination faced by Aboriginal people and encourage Aboriginal people themselves to resist discrimination.

As mentioned above, Indigenous Australians received lower wages than their non-Indigenous counterparts in employment. Aboriginal and Torres Strait Islander people in Queensland in particular had their income quarantined by the Protector and were allowed a minimal amount of their income. In 1966, Vincent Lingiari led the famous Wave Hill walk-off (Gurindji strike) of Indigenous employees of Wave Hill Station in protest against poor pay and conditions (later the subject of the Paul Kelly and Kev Carmody song "From Little Things Big Things Grow"). Since 1999, the Queensland Government, under pressure from the Queensland Council of Unions, has established a number of schemes to give any earned income not received at the time back to Indigenous Australians.

The landmark 1967 referendum called by Prime Minister Harold Holt allowed the Commonwealth to make laws with respect to Aboriginal people by modifying section 51(xxvi) of the Constitution, and for Aboriginal people to be included when the country does a count to determine electoral representation by repealing section 127. The referendum passed with 90.77% voter support.

In the controversial 1971 Gove land rights case, Justice Blackburn ruled that Australia had been terra nullius before British settlement, and that no concept of native title existed in Australian law. Following the 1973 Woodward commission, in 1975 the federal government under Gough Whitlam drafted the Aboriginal Land Rights Bill. This was enacted the following year under the Fraser government as the Aboriginal Land Rights (Northern Territory) Act 1976, which recognised Aboriginal Australians' system of land rights in the Northern Territory, and established the basis upon which Aboriginal people in the NT could claim rights to land based on traditional occupation.

In 1985, the Australian government returned ownership of Uluru (Ayers Rock) to the Pitjantjatjara Aboriginal people. In 1992, the High Court of Australia reversed Justice Blackburn's ruling and handed down its decision in the Mabo Case, declaring the previous legal concept of terra nullius to be invalid and confirming the existence of native title in Australia.

Indigenous Australians began to serve in parliaments from the late 1960s. In 1971, Neville Bonner joined the Australian Senate as a Senator for Queensland for the Liberal Party, becoming the first Indigenous Australian in the Federal Parliament. A year later, the Aboriginal Tent Embassy was established on the steps of Parliament House in Canberra. In 1976, Sir Douglas Nicholls was appointed as the 28th Governor of South Australia, the first Aboriginal person appointed to vice-regal office. In the general election of 2010, Ken Wyatt of the Liberal Party became the first Indigenous Australian elected to the Australian House of Representatives. In the general election of 2016, Linda Burney of the Australian Labor Party became the second Indigenous Australian, and the first Indigenous Australian woman, elected to the Australian House of Representatives. She was immediately appointed Shadow Minister for Human Services.

In sport Evonne Goolagong Cawley became the world number-one ranked tennis player in 1971 and won 14 Grand Slam titles during her career. In 1973 Arthur Beetson became the first Indigenous Australian to captain his country in any sport when he first led the Australian National Rugby League team, the Kangaroos. In 1982, Mark Ella became Captain of the Australian National Rugby Union Team, the Wallabies. In 2000, Aboriginal sprinter Cathy Freeman lit the Olympic flame at the opening ceremony of the 2000 Summer Olympics in Sydney, and went on to win the 400 metres at the Games. In 2019, tennis player Ashleigh Barty was ranked world number one.

In 1984, a group of Pintupi people who were living a traditional hunter-gatherer desert-dwelling life were tracked down in the Gibson Desert in Western Australia and brought in to a settlement. They are believed to have been the last uncontacted tribe in Australia.

During this period, the federal government enacted a number of significant, but controversial, policy initiatives in relation to Indigenous Australians. A representative body, the Aboriginal and Torres Strait Islander Commission (ATSIC), was set up in 1990.

Reconciliation

Reconciliation between non-Indigenous and Indigenous Australians became a significant issue in Australian politics in the late 20th century. In 1991, the Council for Aboriginal Reconciliation was established by the federal government to facilitate reconciliation. In 1998, a Constitutional Convention which selected a Republican model for a referendum included just six Indigenous participants, leading Monarchist delegate Neville Bonner to end his contribution to the convention with his Jagera tribal "Sorry Chant" in sadness at the low number of Indigenous representatives.

An inquiry into the Stolen Generations was launched in 1995 by the Keating government, and the final report delivered in 1997 – the Bringing Them Home report – estimated that around 10% to 33% of all Aboriginal children had been separated from their families for the duration of the policies. The succeeding Howard government largely ignored the recommendations provided by the report, one of which was a formal apology to Aboriginal Australians for the Stolen Generations.

The republican model, as well as a proposal for a new Constitutional preamble which would have included the "honouring" of Aboriginal and Torres Strait Islander people, was put to referendum but did not succeed. In 1999, the Australian Parliament passed a Motion of Reconciliation drafted by Prime Minister John Howard in consultation with Aboriginal Senator Aden Ridgeway naming mistreatment of Indigenous Australians as the most "blemished chapter in our national history", although Howard refused to offer any formal apology.

On 13 February 2008, Prime Minister Kevin Rudd issued a formal apology to Australia's Indigenous peoples, on behalf of the federal government of Australia, for the suffering caused by the Stolen Generations.

21st century
In 2001, the Federal Government dedicated Reconciliation Place in Canberra. On 13 February 2008, Prime Minister Kevin Rudd reversed Howard's decision and issued a public apology to members of the Stolen Generations on behalf of the Australian Government.

ATSIC was abolished by the Australian Government in 2004 amidst allegations of corruption.

Emergency Response/Stronger Futures
The Northern Territory National Emergency Response (also known as the Intervention) was launched in 2007 by the government of Prime Minister John Howard, in response to the Little Children are Sacred report into allegations of child abuse among Aboriginal communities in the NT. The government banned alcohol in prescribed communities in the Territory; quarantined a percentage of welfare payments for essential goods purchasing; dispatched additional police and medical personnel to the region; and suspended the permit system for access to Aboriginal communities. In addition to these measures, the army were released into communities and there were increased police powers, which were later further increased with the so-called "paperless arrests" legislation.

In 2010, United Nations Special Rapporteur James Anaya found the Emergency Response to be racially discriminatory, and said that aspects of it represented a limitation on "individual autonomy". These findings were criticised by the government's Indigenous Affairs Minister Jenny Macklin, the Opposition and Indigenous leaders like Warren Mundine and Bess Price.

In 2011, the Australian government enacted legislation to implement the Stronger Futures policy, which is intended to address key issues that exist within Aboriginal communities of the Northern Territory such as unemployment, school attendance and enrolment, alcohol abuse, community safety and child protection, food security and housing and land reforms. The policy has been criticised by organisations such as Amnesty International and other groups, including on the basis that it maintains "racially-discriminatory" elements of the Emergency Response Act and continues control by the federal government over "Aboriginal people and their lands".

Constitutional change proposed
In 2010, the federal government appointed a panel comprising Indigenous leaders, other legal experts and some members of parliament (including Ken Wyatt) to provide advice on how best to recognise Aboriginal and Torres Strait Islander peoples in the federal Constitution. The panel's recommendations, reported to the federal government in January 2012, included deletion of provisions of the Constitution referencing race (Section 25 and Section 51(xxvi)), and new provisions on meaningful recognition and further protection from discrimination. Subsequently, a proposed referendum on Constitutional recognition of Indigenous Australians was ultimately abandoned in 2013.

The Uluru Statement from the Heart was released 26 May 2017 by delegates to an Aboriginal and Torres Strait Islander Referendum Convention, held near Uluru in Central Australia. The statement calls for a "First Nations Voice" in the Australian Constitution and a "Makarrata Commission" to supervise a process of "agreement-making" and "truth-telling" between government and Aboriginal and Torres Strait Islander peoples. The statement references the 1967 referendum which brought about changes to the Constitution to include Indigenous Australians.

Population

Pre-colonisation
It has been variously estimated that before the arrival of British settlers, the population of Indigenous (probably Aboriginal only) Australians was approximately 318,000–1,000,000 with the distribution being similar to that of the current Australian population, the majority living in the south-east, centred along the Murray River.

Definition 

Over time Australia has used various means to determine membership of ethnic groups such as lineage, blood quantum, birth and self-determination. From 1869 until well into the 1970s, children under 12 years of age with 25% or less Aboriginal blood were considered "white" and were often removed from their families by the Australian Federal and State government agencies and church missions, under acts of their respective parliaments in order that they would have "a reasonable chance of absorption into the white community to which they rightly belong". Grey areas in determination of ethnicity led to people of mixed ancestry being caught in the middle of divisive policies which often led to absurd situations: In 1935, an Australian of part Indigenous descent left his home on a reserve to visit a nearby hotel where he was ejected for being Aboriginal. He returned home but was refused entry to the reserve because he was not Aboriginal. He attempted to remove his children from the reserve but was told he could not because they were Aboriginal. He then walked to the next town where he was arrested for being an Aboriginal vagrant and sent to the reserve there. During World War II he tried to enlist but was rejected because he was an Aborigine so he moved to another state where he enlisted as a non-Aborigine. After the end of the war he applied for a passport but was rejected as he was an Aborigine, he obtained an exemption under the Aborigines Protection Act but was now told he could no longer visit his relatives as he was not an Aborigine. He was later told he could not join the Returned Servicemens Club because he was an Aborigine.

In 1983 the High Court of Australia (in the Commonwealth v Tasmania or "Tasmanian dam(s) case") defined an Aboriginal or Torres Strait Islander as "a person of Aboriginal or Torres Strait Islander descent who identifies as an Aboriginal or Torres Strait Islander and is accepted as such by the community in which he or she lives". The ruling was a three-part definition comprising descent, self-identification and community identification. The first part – descent – was genetic descent and unambiguous, but led to cases where a lack of records to prove ancestry excluded some. Self- and community identification were more problematic as they meant that an Indigenous person separated from his or her community due to a family dispute could no longer identify as Aboriginal.

As a result, there arose court cases throughout the 1990s where excluded people demanded that their Aboriginality be recognised. As a result, lower courts refined the High Court test when subsequently applying it. In 1995, Justice Drummond in the Federal Court held in Gibbs v Capewell "...either genuine self-identification as Aboriginal alone or Aboriginal communal recognition as such by itself may suffice, according to the circumstances." This contributed to an increase of 31% in the number of people identifying as Indigenous Australians in the 1996 census when compared to the 1991 census. In 1998 Justice Merkel held in Shaw v Wolf that Aboriginal descent is "technical" rather than "real" – thereby eliminating a genetic requirement. This decision established that anyone can classify him or herself legally as an Aboriginal, provided he or she is accepted as such by his or her community.

Demographics

Inclusion in the National Census 

Indigenous Australians have been counted in every census albeit only approximately and using inconsistent definitions. Section 127 of the Constitution, which was repealed in 1967, had excluded "aboriginal natives" from being counted in the overall population statistics for each state and territory and nationally with the Attorney-General providing a legal advice that a person was an 'aboriginal native' if they were a 'full-blood aboriginal'. As a consequence of section 127, Indigenous Australians in remote areas uninhabited by non-Indigenous Australians were not counted prior to 1967 in censuses and sometimes estimated.

Post 1967, Torres Strait Islanders were considered a separate Indigenous people. Prior to 1947, Torres Strait Islanders were considered to be Aboriginal in censuses. In the 1947 census, Torres Strait Islanders were considered to be Polynesian and in the 1954 and 1961 censuses were considered to be Pacific Islanders. In the 1966 census, Torres Strait Islanders were considered to be Aboriginal.

A "Commonwealth working definition" for Indigenous Australians was developed from 1968 and endorsed by Cabinet in 1978 which contains elements of descent, self-identification and community recognition in contrast to the earlier preponderance of Aboriginal blood definition.

As there is no formal procedure for any community to record acceptance, the primary method of determining Indigenous population is from self-identification on census forms. The Australian Census includes counts based on questions relating to individuals' self-identification as Aboriginal, Torres Strait Islander, or of both origins. Owing to various difficulties which lead to under-counting, the Australian Bureau of Statistics (ABS) follows a set method to estimate total numbers.

Distribution and growth 

The 2006 Australian census showed growth in the Indigenous population (recorded as 517,000) at twice the rate of overall population growth since 1996, when the Indigenous population stood at 283,000. In the 2011 census, there was a 20% rise in people who identify as Aboriginal. In the 2016 census, there was another 18.4% rise on the 2011 figure. 590,056 respondents identified themselves as Aboriginal, 32,345 Torres Strait Islander, and a further 26,767 both Aboriginal and Torres Strait Islanders. In the 2021 Australian census, 812,000 people identified as Aboriginal and/or Torres Strait Islander, representing 3.2% of the population. This was an increase from 2.8% in 2016 (i.e. about 25%increase), and 2.5% in 2011. However, the net undercount of Aboriginal and Torres Strait Islander people was 17.4%, and the estimated Indigenous population is around 952,000 to 1,000,000, or just under 4 per cent of the total population.

Growth to 2016 was mainly in major cities and along the eastern coast of Australia. In 2018 the ABS published a report exploring the reasons for these findings, with some of the factors behind the increase being higher fertility rates of Indigenous women; people entering the population through migration; variation in census coverage and response rates; and people changing how they self-identify between census years. Another factor might be the children of mixed marriages: the proportion of Aboriginal adults married (de facto or de jure) to non-Aboriginal spouses increased to 78.2% in the 2016 census, (up from 74% in 2011, 64% in 1996, 51% in 1991 and 46% in 1986); it was reported in 2002 that up to 88% of the offspring of mixed marriages subsequently self-identify as Indigenous Australians.

In the 2016, over 33% of the Indigenous population lived in major cities, compared with about 75% of the non-Indigenous population, with a further 24% in "inner regional" areas (compared with 18%), 20% in "outer regional" (8%), while nearly 18% lived in "remote" or "very remote" areas (2%). (Ten years earlier, 31% were living in major cities and 24% in remote areas.)

Indigenous Australians by state

Queensland

Languages

Aboriginal languages

According to the 2005 National Indigenous Languages Survey (NILS), at the time the Australian continent was colonised, there were around 250 different Indigenous languages, with the larger language groups each having up to 100 related dialects. Some of these languages were only ever spoken by perhaps 50 to 100 people. Indigenous languages are divided into language groups with from ten to twenty-four language families identified. It is currently estimated that up to 145 Indigenous languages remain in use, of which fewer than 20 are considered to be strong in the sense that they are still spoken by all age groups. All but 13 Indigenous languages are considered to be endangered. Several extinct Indigenous languages are being reconstructed. For example, the last fluent speaker of the Ngarrindjeri language died in the late 1960s; using recordings and written records as a guide, a Ngarrindjeri dictionary was published in 2009, and the Ngarrindjeri language is today spoken in complete sentences.

Linguists classify many of the mainland Australian languages into one large group, the Pama–Nyungan languages. The rest are sometimes lumped under the term "non-Pama–Nyungan". The Pama–Nyungan languages form the majority, covering most of Australia, and are generally thought to be a family of related languages. In the north, stretching from the Western Kimberley to the Gulf of Carpentaria, are found a number of non-Pama–Nyungan groups of languages which have not been shown to be related to the Pama–Nyungan family nor to each other. While it has sometimes proven difficult to work out familial relationships within the Pama–Nyungan language family, many Australian linguists feel there has been substantial success. Against this, some linguists, such as R. M. W. Dixon, suggest that the Pama–Nyungan group – and indeed the entire Australian linguistic area – is rather a sprachbund, or group of languages having very long and intimate contact, rather than a genetic language family.

It has been suggested that, given their long presence in Australia, Aboriginal languages form one specific sub-grouping. The position of Tasmanian languages is unknown, and it is also unknown whether they comprised one or more than one specific language family.

Nearly three quarters of Australian place names have origins in Aboriginal languages. However, the method of recording names used by early colonial surveyors was often unreliable. When a surveyor was seeking the name of a river, the Aboriginal responder might have given the word for "sand" or "water". Unless living speakers of the original languages remained when systematic research of Indigenous languages began in the 1930s, the meaning of many place names was therefore lost, or is now open to several interpretations. The word "Canberra" was chosen for the national capital. It is popularly believed to mean "meeting place", but this is contested. According to the anthropologist Aldo Massola, the name comes from the word nganbirra meaning "a camping place".

Cross-cultural communications
Cross-cultural miscommunication can sometimes occur between Indigenous and non-Indigenous peoples. According to Michael Walsh and Ghil'ad Zuckermann, Western conversational interaction is typically "dyadic", between two particular people, where eye contact is important and the speaker controls the interaction; and "contained" in a relatively short, defined time frame. However, traditional Aboriginal conversational interaction is "communal", broadcast to many people, eye contact is not important, the listener controls the interaction; and "continuous", spread over a longer, indefinite time frame.

Torres Strait Island languages

There are three languages spoken in the Torres Strait Islands, two indigenous languages and an English-based creole.  The indigenous language spoken mainly in the western and central islands is Kalaw Lagaw Ya, a language related to the Pama–Nyungan languages of the Australian mainland. The other indigenous language spoken mainly in the eastern islands is Meriam Mir: a member of the Trans-Fly languages spoken on the nearby south coast of New Guinea and the only Papuan language spoken on Australian territory. Both languages are agglutinative; however Kalaw Lagaw Ya appears to be undergoing a transition into a declensional language while Meriam Mìr is more clearly agglutinative. Yumplatok, or Torres Strait Creole, the third language, is a non-typical Pacific English Creole and is the main language of communication on the islands.

Belief systems

Traditional beliefs

Aboriginal

In Aboriginal communities knowledge and decision making is shared between tribal elders. Travellers had to seek elder recognition and acknowledge local Elders – this is increasingly practiced in public events in Australia. Within Aboriginal belief systems, a formative epoch known as "the Dreaming" or "the Dreamtime" stretches back into the distant past when the creator ancestors known as the First Peoples travelled across the land, and naming as they went. Indigenous Australia's oral tradition and religious values are based upon reverence for the land and a belief in this Dreamtime. The Dreaming is at once both the ancient time of creation and the present-day reality of Dreaming. Different language and cultural groups each had their own belief structures; these cultures overlapped to a greater or lesser extent, and evolved over time. Major ancestral spirits include the Rainbow Serpent, Baiame, Dirawong and Bunjil. Knowledge contained in the Dreaming has been passed down through different stories, songlines, dances and ceremonies, and even today provides a framework for ongoing relationships, kinship responsibilities and looking after country.

Traditional healers (known as Ngangkari in the Western desert areas of Central Australia) were highly respected men and women who not only acted as healers or doctors, but were generally also custodians of important Dreaming stories.

Torres Strait Islander

Torres Strait Islander people have their own traditional belief systems. Stories of the Tagai represent Torres Strait Islanders as sea people, with a connection to the stars, as well as a system of order in which everything has its place in the world. Some Torres Strait Islander people share beliefs similar to the Aboriginal peoples' Dreaming and "Everywhen" concepts, passed down in oral history.

After colonisation

Christianity and European culture have had a significant impact on Indigenous Australians, their religion and their culture. As in many colonial situations, the churches both facilitated the loss of Indigenous culture and religion and also facilitated its maintenance. In some cases, such as at Hermannsburg, Northern Territory and Piltawodli in Adelaide, the work of missionaries laid the foundations for later language revival. The German missionaries Christian Teichelmann and Schürmann went to Adelaide and taught the local Kaurna people only in their own language and created textbooks in the language. However, some missionaries taught only in English, and some Christian missions were involved in the placement of Aboriginal and Torres Strait Islander children after they were removed from their parents upon orders of the government, and are therefore implicated in the Stolen Generations.

Aboriginal peoples
The involvement of Christians in Aboriginal affairs has evolved significantly since 1788. The Churches became involved in mission work among Aboriginal peoples in the 19th century as Europeans came to control much of the continent, and the majority of the population was eventually converted. Colonial clergy such as Sydney's first Catholic archbishop, John Bede Polding, strongly advocated for Aboriginal rights and dignity. Around the year 2000, many churches and church organisations officially apologised for past failures to adequately respect Indigenous cultures and address the injustices of the dispossession of Indigenous people.

A small minority of Aboriginal people are followers of Islam as a result of intermarriage with "Afghan" camel drivers brought to Australia in the late 19th and early 20th century to help explore and open up the interior.

Torres Strait Islander peoples
From the 1870s, Christianity spread throughout the Torres Strait Islands, and it remains strong today among Torres Strait Islander people everywhere. The London Missionary Society mission led by Rev. Samuel Macfarlane arrived on Erub (Darnley Island) on 1 July 1871, establishing its first base in the region there. The Islanders refer to this as "The Coming of the Light", or "Coming of Light" and all Island communities celebrate the occasion annually on 1 July. However the coming of Christianity did not spell the end of the people's traditional beliefs; their culture informed their understanding of the new religion, as the Christian God was welcomed and the new religion was integrated into every aspect of their everyday lives.

Recent census figures
In the 2016 Census, Australia's Indigenous and non-Indigenous population were broadly similar with 54% (vs 55%) reporting a Christian affiliation, while less than 2% reported traditional beliefs as their religion, and 36% reported no religion. The proportion of Indigenous people who reported no religion has increased gradually since 2001, standing at 36% in 2016. According to "Table 8: Religious Affiliation by Indigenous Status", 347,572 Indigenous people (out of the total 649,171 in Australia) declared an affiliation to some form of Christianity, with a higher proportion of Torres Strait Islander than Aboriginal people in this number. 7,773 reported traditional beliefs; 1,511 Islam; other religions numbered less than 1,000 each. However the question is optional; 48,670 did not respond, and in addition, nearly 4,000 were reported as "inadequately described".
(In the 2006 census, 73% of the Indigenous population reported an affiliation with a Christian denomination, 24% reported no religious affiliation and 1% reported affiliation with an Australian Aboriginal traditional religion.)

Culture

Art 

 

Australia has a tradition of Aboriginal art which is thousands of years old, the best known forms being Australian rock art and bark painting. Evidence of Aboriginal art can be traced back at least 30,000 years, with examples of ancient rock art throughout the continent. Some of these are in national parks such as those of the UNESCO listed sites at Uluru and Kakadu National Park in the Northern Territory, but examples can also within protected parks in urban areas such as at Ku-ring-gai Chase National Park in Sydney. The Sydney rock engravings are between 5000 and 200 years old. Murujuga in Western Australia was heritage listed in 2007.

In terms of age and abundance, cave art in Australia is comparable to that of Lascaux and Altamira (Upper Paleolithic sites in Europe), and Aboriginal art is believed to be the oldest continuing tradition of art in the world. There are three major regional styles: the geometric style found in Central Australia, Tasmania, the Kimberley and Victoria, known for its concentric circles, arcs and dots; the simple figurative style found in Queensland; and the complex figurative style found in Arnhem Land and the Kimberley. These designs generally carry significance linked to the spirituality of the Dreamtime. Paintings were usually created in earthy colours, from paint made from ochre. Such ochres were also used to paint their bodies for ceremonial purposes.

Several styles of Aboriginal art have developed in modern times, including the watercolour paintings of the Hermannsburg School and the acrylic Papunya Tula "dot art" movement. Some notable Aboriginal artists include William Barak (c.1824–1903) and Albert Namatjira (1902–1959).

Since the 1970s, Indigenous artists have employed the use of acrylic paints – with styles such as that of the Western Desert Art Movement becoming globally renowned 20th-century art movements.

The National Gallery of Australia exhibits a great many Indigenous art works, including those of the Torres Strait Islands who are known for their traditional sculpture and headgear.

Aboriginal art has influenced many non-Indigenous artists, such as Margaret Preston (1875–1963) and Elizabeth Durack (1915–2000).

Music, dance and ceremony 

Music and dance have formed an integral part of the social, cultural and ceremonial observances of people through the millennia of the individual and collective histories of Australian Indigenous peoples to the present day. Around 1950, the first research into Aboriginal music was undertaken by the anthropologist A. P. Elkin, who recorded Aboriginal music in Arnhem Land.

The various Aboriginal peoples developed unique musical instruments and styles. The didgeridoo, which is widely thought to be a stereotypical instrument of Aboriginal people, was traditionally played by Aboriginal men of the eastern Kimberley region and Arnhem Land (such as the Yolngu). Bullroarers and clapsticks were used across Australia. Songlines relate to the Dreamtime in Aboriginal culture, overlapping with oral lore. Corroboree is a generic word to explain different genres of performance, embracing songs, dances, rallies and meetings of various kinds.

Indigenous musicians have been prominent in various contemporary styles of music, including creating a sub-genre of rock music as well as participating in pop and other mainstream styles. Hip hop music is helping preserve some Indigenous languages.

The Aboriginal Centre for the Performing Arts in Brisbane teaches acting, music and dance, and the Bangarra Dance Theatre is an acclaimed contemporary dance company.

For Torres Strait Islander people, singing and dancing is their "literature" – "the most important aspect of Torres Strait lifestyle. The Torres Strait Islanders preserve and present their oral history through songs and dances;... the dances act as illustrative material and, of course, the dancer himself is the storyteller" (Ephraim Bani, 1979).

Literature 

There was no written form of the many languages spoken by Indigenous peoples before colonisation. A letter to Governor Arthur Phillip written by Bennelong in 1796 is the first known work written in English by an Aboriginal person. The historic Yirrkala bark petitions of 1963 are the first traditional Aboriginal documents recognised by the Australian Parliament.

In the 20th century, David Unaipon (1872–1967), known as the first Aboriginal author, is credited for providing the first accounts of Aboriginal mythology written by an Aboriginal person, in his Legendary Tales of the Aborigines (1924–1925). Oodgeroo Noonuccal (1920–1995) was a famous Aboriginal poet, writer and rights activist, credited with publishing the first book of verse by an Aboriginal author, We Are Going (1964). Sally Morgan's novel My Place (1987) was considered a breakthrough memoir in terms of bringing Indigenous stories to a wider audience. The talents of playwrights Jack Davis and Kevin Gilbert were recognised. Poetry by Indigenous poets, including traditional song-poetry – ranging from sacred to everyday – has been published since the late 20th century.

Writers coming to prominence in the 21st century include Alexis Wright; Kim Scott (twice winner of the Miles Franklin Award); Tara June Winch; Melissa Lucashenko; playwright and comedy writer Nakkiah Lui; in poetry Yvette Holt; and in popular fiction Anita Heiss. Leading activists Marcia Langton, who wrote First Australians (2008) and Noel Pearson (Up From the Mission, 2009) are  active contemporary contributors to Australian literature. Journalist Stan Grant has written several non-fiction works on what it means to be Aboriginal in contemporary Australia, and Bruce Pascoe has written both fiction and non-fiction works. AustLit's BlackWords project provides a comprehensive listing of Aboriginal and Torres Strait Islander Writers and Storytellers. The Living Archive of Aboriginal Languages contains stories written in traditional languages of the Northern Territory.

Film and television 

Australian cinema has a long history, and the ceremonies of Indigenous Australians were among the first subjects to be filmed in Australia – notably a film of Aboriginal dancers in Central Australia, shot by the anthropologist Baldwin Spencer and F.J. Gillen in 1900–1903.

Jedda (1955) was the first Australian feature film to be shot in colour film, the first to star Aboriginal actors in lead roles (Ngarla Kunoth and Robert Tudawali), and the first to be entered at the Cannes Film Festival. 1971's Walkabout was a British film set in Australia; it was a forerunner to many Australian films related to indigenous themes and introduced David Gulpilil to cinematic audiences. Chant of Jimmie Blacksmith (1976), directed by Fred Schepisi, was an award-winning historical drama from a book by Thomas Keneally, about the tragic story of an Aboriginal bushranger. Peter Weir's 1977 mystery drama The Last Wave, also starring Gulpilil and featuring elements of Aboriginal beliefs and culture, won several AACTA Awards.

The canon of films related to Indigenous Australians increased from the 1990s, with Nick Parson's film Dead Heart (1996) featuring Ernie Dingo and Bryan Brown; Rolf de Heer's The Tracker (2002), starring Gary Sweet and David Gulpilil; and Phillip Noyce's Rabbit-Proof Fence (2002).

The soundtrack of the 2006 film Ten Canoes directed by Rolf de Heer was filmed entirely in dialects of the Yolŋu Matha language group, with the main version featuring subtitles and English narration by David Gulpilil. The film won the Un Certain Regard Special Jury Prize at the 2006 Cannes Film Festival.
The Straits, a 2012 drama series for TV based on an idea by Torres Strait Islander actor Aaron Fa'aoso, was partly filmed in the Torres Strait Islands and starred Fa'aoso and Jimi Bani (from Mabuiag Island), as well as Papua New Guinean actors. The documentary TV series Blue Water Empire (aired 2019), featuring Fa'aoso and Bani, tells the story of Torres Strait Islands from pre-colonial era up to contemporary times.

Many Indigenous actors, directors, producers and others have been involved in the production of film and TV series in the 21st century: Ivan Sen, Rachel Perkins (with her company Blackfella Films), Aaron Pedersen, Deborah Mailman, Warwick Thornton, Leah Purcell, Shari Sebbens, Sally Riley, Luke Carroll and Miranda Tapsell, Wayne Blair, and Trisha Morton-Thomas, among others, with many of them well-represented in award nominations and wins. The films Sweet Country (2017), Top End Wedding (2019) and TV series Cleverman and Total Control (2019), all made by Aboriginal film-makers and featuring Aboriginal themes, were well-received and in some cases won awards.

The third series of the sketch comedy TV series Black Comedy, co-written by Nakkiah Lui, Adam Briggs, Steven Oliver and others, and featuring many Indigenous actors, began to air in January 2020.

Theatre

Recreation and sport 

Though lost to history, many traditional forms of recreation were played and while these varied from tribe to tribe, there were often similarities. Ball games were quite popular and played by tribes across Australia, as were games based on use of weapons. There is extensive documented evidence of traditional football games being played. Perhaps the most documented is a game popularly played by tribes in western Victorian regions of the Wimmera, Mallee and Millewa by the Djab wurrung, Jardwadjali and Jarijari people. Known as Marn Grook, it was a type of kick and catch football game played with a ball made of possum hide. According to some accounts, it was played as far away as the Yarra Valley by the Wurundjeri people, Gippsland by the Gunai people, and the Riverina in south-western New South Wales. Some historians claim that Marn Grook had a role in the formation of Australian rules football, and many Aboriginal people, from children in remote communities to professional players at the highest level, the Australian Football League, play the modern game. Well-known players include Graham Farmer, Gavin Wanganeen and Adam Goodes. Goodes was also the Australian of the Year for 2014.

A team of Aboriginal cricketers from the Western District of Victoria toured England in 1868, making it the first Australian sports team to travel overseas. Cricketer and Australian rules football pioneer Tom Wills coached the team in an Aboriginal language he learnt as a child, and Charles Lawrence accompanied them to England. Johnny Mullagh, the team's star player, was regarded as one of the era's finest batsmen.

Evonne Goolagong became the world number-one ranked female tennis player, with 14 tennis titles. Sprinter Cathy Freeman earned gold medals in the Olympics, World Championships, and Commonwealth Games. Lionel Rose earned a world title in boxing. Arthur Beetson, Laurie Daley and Gorden Tallis captained Australia in rugby league, while Mark Ella captained Australia in rugby union. Nathan Jawai and Patty Mills have played in the National Basketball Association.

Sporting teams include the Indigenous All-Stars, Flying Boomerangs and Indigenous Team of the Century in Australian rules football, and the Indigenous All Stars, NSW Koori Knockout and the Murri Rugby League Team in rugby league.

Contemporary issues

Closing the Gap

To this day, the forced removal of children known as the Stolen Generations has had a huge impact on the psyche, health and well-being of Indigenous Australians; it has seriously impacted not only the children removed and their parents, but their descendants as well. Not only were many of the children abused – psychologically, physically, or sexually – after being removed and while living in group homes or adoptive families, but were also deprived of their culture alongside their families. This has resulted in the disruption of oral culture, as parents were unable to communicate their knowledge to their children, and thus much has been lost.

There are many issues facing Indigenous people in Australia today when compared with the non-Indigenous population, despite some improvements. Several of these are interrelated, and include health (including shorter life expectancy and higher rates of infant mortality), lower levels of education and employment, inter-generational trauma, high imprisonment rates, substance abuse and lack of political representation.

Some demographic facts are related to these issues, as cause and/or result:

 In the 2016 Australian Census, over 33% of the Indigenous population lived in major cities, compared with about 75% of the non-Indigenous population, with a further 24% in "inner regional" areas (compared with 18%), 20% in "outer regional" (8%), while nearly 18% lived in "remote" or "very remote" areas (2%).
 The Indigenous population of Australia is much younger than the non-Indigenous population, with an estimated median age of 21 years (37 years for non-Indigenous), due to higher rates of birth and death. For this reason, age standardisation is often used when comparing Indigenous and non-Indigenous statistics.

The federal government's Closing the Gap strategy, created in 2008 and coordinated by the National Indigenous Australians Agency since July 2019, aims to address multiple areas to improve the lives of Indigenous peoples. Draft targets for 2019 were created by the Council of Australian Governments (COAG) in December 2018. These were in the following areas:
 families, children and youth
 health
 education
 economic development
 housing
 justice (including youth justice)
 land and water, "where Aboriginal and Torres Strait Islander peoples' land, water and cultural rights are realised"
 cross-system priorities, which "addresses racism, discrimination and social inclusion, healing and trauma, and the promotion of culture and language for Aboriginal and Torres Strait Islander peoples"

Health 

Social and cultural determinants such as discrimination, lack of education or employment (and therefore income), and cultural disconnection can impact both physical and mental health, and contemporary disadvantage is related to colonisation and its ongoing impact.

Successive censuses have shown, that (after adjusting for demographic structures) Indigenous Australians experience greater rates of renal disease, several communicable diseases (such as tuberculosis and hepatitis C virus), type 2 diabetes, respiratory disease, poor mental health and other illnesses than the general population.

Life expectancy
The life expectancy of Indigenous Australians is difficult to quantify accurately. Indigenous deaths are poorly identified, and the official figures for the size of the population at risk include large adjustment factors. Two estimates of Indigenous life expectancy in 2008 differed by as much as five years. The ABS introduced a new method in 2009, but problems remained. A 2013 study, referring to the national Indigenous reform policy, Closing the Gap, looked at the difficulties in interpreting the extent of the gap because of differing methods of estimating life expectancy between 2007 and 2012. The 2019 report by the Close the Gap campaign reported that the gap in life expectancy was "widening rather than closing".

Infant mortality (ages 0–4) was twice as high as for non-Indigenous children in 2014–6.

Mental health
Mental health, suicide and self-harm remain major concerns, with the suicide rate being double that of the non-Indigenous population in 2015, and young people experiencing rising rates of mental health difficulties. There are high incidences of anxiety, depression, PTSD and suicide amongst the Stolen Generations, with this resulting in unstable parenting and family situations.

Substance abuse 
Many Indigenous communities suffer from a range of health, social and legal problems associated with substance abuse of both legal and illegal drugs, including but not limited to alcohol abuse, petrol sniffing, the use of illegal drugs such as methamphetamine ("ice") and cannabis and smoking tobacco. Tobacco use has been estimated to be the "greatest contributor (23%) to the gap in the disease burden between Indigenous and non-Indigenous Australians", with Indigenous people 2.5 times more likely to smoke daily than non-Indigenous Australians.

Indigenous Australians were 1.6 times as likely to abstain completely from alcohol than non-Indigenous people in 2012–3. Foetal alcohol syndrome has been a problem, but the rate of pregnant women drinking had halved between 2008 and 2015 (from 20% to 10%).

Petrol sniffing has been a problem among some remote communities. A 2018 longitudinal study by the University of Queensland (UQ), commissioned by the National Indigenous Australians Agency, reported that the number of people sniffing petrol in the 25 communities studied had declined by 95.2%, from 453 to just 22, related to the distribution of a new, low aromatic petrol, Opal, in NT in 2005.

The 2018 UQ study also reported that alcohol and cannabis were the drugs causing most concern. Ice was reported present in 8 of the 25 communities, but nearly all only occasional use.

Education 

There is a significant gap between Indigenous and non-Indigenous people in educational attainment. This presents significant issues for employment. , Indigenous students or adults, when compared with non-Indigenous peers:
 Have a lower school attendance rate, with these rates at 82% and 93% respectively (in remote areas, as low as 63%)
 Have lower literacy and numeracy, although rates had improved significantly on some NAPLAN (standardised school testing) measures
 Reach Year 12 at a lower rate, with improvement from 59% to 74% between 2006 and 2016, with the gap at 24% in 2016
 Are underrepresented in higher education and have lower completion rates

Closing the Gap has focused on improving education for Indigenous people, with some success. Attainment of Year 12 or equivalent for ages 20–24 has increased from 47.4% in 2006 to 65.3% in 2016. This has led to more Indigenous people undertaking higher or vocational education courses. According to the Closing the Gap report, Indigenous students in higher education award courses more than doubled in number over the decade from 2006 (9,329) to 2017 (19,237).

However, most of the Closing the Gap targets for education are not on track. In general, the gaps have improved (such as in NAPLAN results) or not devolved (school attendance rate remaining stable for several years) have not met targets. Remoteness seems to be a factor; students in isolated or remote communities do not perform or attend as well as students in urban areas. The Closing the Gap Report 2019 reported that of the seven targets, only two – early childhood education and Year 12 attainment – had been met. Only Year 9 numeracy was on track in all states and territories, with variations among them.

Various studies have measured the median IQ for Aboriginal Australians as being between 52 and 70, likely a significant factor in educational difficulties.

The Aboriginal Centre for the Performing Arts was established as a training centre by the state and federal governments in 1997.

Employment 
Compared to the national average, Indigenous people experience high unemployment and poverty rates. As of the 2018 Closing the Gap Report, the Indigenous employment rate had decreased from 48% to 46.6% between 2006 and 2016, while the non-Indigenous employment rate remained steady at around 72% (a 25.4% gap). The employment rate for Indigenous women, however, increased from 39% to 44.8% in the same period.

A 2016 ABS report on labour force characteristics show low employment rates. An analysis of the figures suggested significant barriers to Indigenous people gaining employment, possibly including job location, employer discrimination, and lack of education and others. A big factor is education. Those with a degree had an employment probability of 85% (for males) and 74% (for females) for gaining employment, decreasing along with qualifications, so that those who have completed Year 9 and below have a 43% (male) and 32% (female) probability of gaining employment. Other factors, unlike education, are not covered by government policy, such as discrimination and unfair treatment. Employed Indigenous Australians were more likely to experience discrimination than those who are unemployed, and it has been found that the second most common source of unfair treatment (after members of the public) is at work or applying for work. There was also a significant lack of consultation with Indigenous peoples on the methods they think best to tackle issues like unemployment.

Crime 

Indigenous Australians are over-represented in Australia's criminal justice system. , Aboriginal and Torres Strait Islander prisoners represented 28% of the total adult prisoner population, while accounting for 3.3% of the general population. In May 2018, Indigenous women made up 34% of all women imprisoned in Australia. A 2017–2018 report into youth justice undertaken by the Australian Institute of Health and Welfare reported that about half (a total of 2,339) of the young people aged 10–17 under supervision in 2016–17 were Indigenous, although of that age group, Indigenous youth represent 5% of the general population. It concludes from the data that there is a clear issue occurring not only within Australia's criminal justice system, but within communities as a whole.

Explanations given for this over-representation include the economic position of Indigenous Australians, the knock-on effects of the stolen generations and disconnection from land, the effects of their health and housing situations, their ability to access an economic base such as land and employment, their education, and the use of alcohol and other drugs.

Indigenous Australians are also over-represented as victims of crime, in particular, assault. Indigenous women are highly over-represented in this figure, accounting for a higher proportion of assault victims than the non-Indigenous category.

In 2007, the Northern Territory Government commissioned a Board of Inquiry into the Protection of Aboriginal Children from Sexual Abuse, which produced a report known as the Little Children are Sacred report. This suggested, based largely on anecdotal evidence, that children in remote Aboriginal communities in NT were suffering from widespread sexual abuse. The Australian Human Rights Commission's Social Justice Report 2008 said that the 2005–2006 ABS statistics did not appear to support the "allegations of endemic child abuse... that was the rationale for the NTER" ("The Intervention" by the Howard government) that followed.

Family violence

The rate of family violence in Indigenous Australian communities, especially in the Northern Territory, has been high for many years, and under-reported. It has been estimated to be around 34 times greater than the national rate, and, in the worst areas, up to 80 times. There is no single cause for this high rate, but several probable causes or aggravating factors have been suggested by various researchers and stakeholders, including: dispossession of land and subsequent displacement of communities; childhood abuse experienced by the Stolen Generations, along with intergenerational trauma; economic disadvantage; violent family environments; poor health; inadequate housing; racism; loss of Aboriginal identity; and many others. An AIHW survey covering eight years to 2019, published in December 2021, revealed that Aboriginal and Torres Strait Islander people accounted for 28 per cent of all hospitalisations due to family violence, despite only making up 3.3% of the total population. Various reasons were suggested by experts, including Aboriginal men's control of decision-making, and limited independence for women owing to economic factors; barriers in access to services; racism by some police and other services; and lack of enough Aboriginal-run organisations providing culturally safe services.

As the federal government, upon being urged by experts to create the means to halt the violence in 2021, announced an extra  "to boost frontline services in the Northern Territory... and to work towards our Closing the Gap commitments", in addition to other funding already committed to the states and NT under the National Partnership on Family, Domestic and Sexual Violence Responses.

Political issues

Timeline
Since the 20th century there have been a number of individuals and organisations who have instigated significant events in the struggle for political representation, land rights and other political issues affecting the lives of Indigenous Australians:
 1937: Yorta Yorta man William Cooper collects 1800 signatures to petition King George VI for representation of the original occupants of Australia in federal Parliament.
 26 January (Australia Day) 1938: The Aborigines Progressive Association holds a Day of Mourning, to protest 150 years of callous treatment and the seizure of land.

Political representation 

Under Section 41 of the Australian Constitution, Aboriginal Australians always had the legal right to vote in Australian Commonwealth elections if their State granted them that right. This meant that all Aboriginal peoples outside Queensland and Western Australia had a legal right to vote. The right of Indigenous ex-servicemen to vote was affirmed in 1949 and all Indigenous Australians gained the unqualified right to vote in Federal elections in 1962. Unlike other Australians, however, voting was not made compulsory for Indigenous people, and it was not until the repeal of Section 127 of the Constitution of Australia following the 1967 referendum that Indigenous Australians were counted in the population for the purposes of distribution of electoral seats.

, six Indigenous Australians have been elected to the Australian Senate: Neville Bonner (Liberal, 1971–1983), Aden Ridgeway (Democrat, 1999–2005), Nova Peris (Labor, 2013–2016), Jacqui Lambie (2014–2017, 2019–incumbent), Pat Dodson (Labor, 2016– incumbent), and former Northern Territory MLA Malarndirri McCarthy (Labor, 2016– incumbent).

Following the 2010 Australian Federal Election, Ken Wyatt of the Liberal Party won the Western Australian seat of Hasluck, becoming the first Indigenous person elected to the Australian House of Representatives. His nephew, Ben Wyatt, was concurrently serving as Shadow Treasurer in the Western Australian Parliament and in 2011 considered a challenge for the Labor Party leadership in that state. Linda Burney became the second Indigenous person, and the first woman, to serve in the federal House of Representatives.

In March 2013, Adam Giles of the Country Liberal Party (CLP) became Chief Minister of the Northern Territory – the first Indigenous Australian to become head of government in a state or territory of Australia. Hyacinth Tungutalum, also of the CLP, was the first Indigenous person elected to any Australian (state or territory) parliament. A Tiwi man from Bathurst Island, he was elected to the Northern Territory Legislative Assembly in October 1974 as the member for Tiwi.

A number of Indigenous people represent electorates at state and territory level, and South Australia has had an Aboriginal Governor, Sir Douglas Nicholls.  The first Indigenous Australian to serve as a minister in any government was Ernie Bridge, who entered the Western Australian Parliament in 1980. Carol Martin was the first Aboriginal woman elected to a State parliament in Australia (the Western Australian Legislative Assembly) in 2001, and the first woman minister was Marion Scrymgour, who was appointed to the Northern Territory ministry in 2002 (she became Deputy Chief Minister in 2008). Representation in the Northern Territory has been relatively high, reflecting the high proportion of Aboriginal voters. The 2012 Territory election saw large swings to the conservative CLP in remote Territory electorates, and a total of five Aboriginal CLP candidates won election to the Assembly, along with one Labor candidate, in a chamber of 25 members. Among those elected for the CLP were high-profile activists Bess Price and Alison Anderson.

Forty people identifying as of Indigenous Australian ancestry have been members of the ten Australian legislatures. Of these, 22 have been in the Northern Territory Legislative Assembly. The Northern Territory has an exceptionally high Indigenous proportion (about one third) of its population. Adam Giles, who was Chief Minister of the Northern Territory from 2013 to 2016, was the first Indigenous head of government in Australia. In 1974, the year of its creation, the Northern Territory Legislative Assembly was also the first Australian parliament to have an Indigenous member elected to it.

Federal government initiatives
The Aboriginal and Torres Strait Islander Commission (ATSIC) was set up as a representative body in 1990 under the Hawke government. In 2004, the Howard government disbanded ATSIC and replaced it and the Aboriginal and Torres Strait Islander Services (ATSIS) Regional and State Offices with an appointed network of Indigenous Coordination Centres (ICC) that administer Shared Responsibility Agreements and Regional Partnership Agreements with Aboriginal communities at a local level. ICCs operate as whole-of-government centres, housing staff from a number of departments to deliver services to Indigenous Australians.

Major political parties in Australia have tried to increase Indigenous representation within their parties. One suggestion for achieving this is to introduce seat quotas, as in the Maori electorates in New Zealand.

In October 2007, just before the calling of a federal election, the then Prime Minister, John Howard, revisited the idea of bringing a referendum to seek recognition of Indigenous Australians in the Constitution (his government having previously sought to include recognition of Indigenous peoples in the Preamble to the Constitution in the 1999 Australian republic referendum). His announcement was seen by some as a surprising adoption of the importance of the symbolic aspects of the reconciliation process, and reaction was mixed. The Australian Labor Party initially supported the idea; however Kevin Rudd withdrew this support just before the election, earning a rebuke from activist Noel Pearson.

The Gillard Government (2010–2013), with bi-partisan support, convened an Expert Panel to consider changes to the Australian Constitution that would see recognition for Indigenous Australians, who delivered their report, which included five recommendations for changes to the Constitution as well as recommendations for the referendum process, in January 2012. The Government promised to hold a referendum on the constitutional recognition of Indigenous Australians on or before the federal election due for 2013. The plan was abandoned in September 2012, with Minister Jenny Macklin citing insufficient community awareness for the decision.

In December 2015, the 16-member Aboriginal and Torres Strait Islander Referendum Council was jointly appointed by the Prime Minister, Malcolm Turnbull, and Leader of the Opposition, Bill Shorten. After six months of consultation, the First Nations National Constitutional Convention met over four days from 23 to 26 May 2017, and ratified the Uluru Statement from the Heart by a standing ovation from the gathering of 250 Indigenous leaders. The Statement calls for a "First Nations Voice" in the Australian Constitution and a "Makarrata Commission" (Makarrata is a Yolngu word "describing a process of conflict resolution, peacemaking and justice").

2019: Indigenous voice to government

In May 2019, Prime Minister Scott Morrison created the position of Minister for Indigenous Australians, a Cabinet portfolio in the Second Morrison Ministry, with Ken Wyatt as the inaugural officebearer. On 30 October 2019, Wyatt announced the commencement of a "co-design process" aimed at providing an Indigenous voice to Parliament. The Senior Advisory Group is co-chaired by Professor Tom Calma , Chancellor of the University of Canberra, and Professor Dr Marcia Langton, Associate Provost at the University of Melbourne, and comprises a total of 20 leaders and experts from across the country. The other members are Father Frank Brennan, Peter Buckskin, Josephine Cashman, Marcia Ella-Duncan, Joanne Farrell, Mick Gooda, Chris Kenny, Vonda Malone, June Oscar, Alison Page, Noel Pearson, Benson Saulo, Pat Turner, Maggie Walter, Tony Wurramarrba, Peter Yu, and Dr Galarrwuy Yunupingu. The first meeting of the group was held in Canberra on 13 November 2019.

Native title, sovereignty and treaties 

About 22% of land in Northern Australia (Kimberley, Top End and Cape York) is now Aboriginal-owned. In the last decade, nearly 200 native title claims covering 1.3 million km2 of land – approximately 18% of the Australian continent – have been approved.

In 1992, in Mabo v Queensland, the High Court of Australia recognised native title in Australia for the first time. The majority in the High Court rejected the doctrine of terra nullius, in favour of the concept of native title.

In 2013, an Indigenous group describing itself as the Murrawarri Republic declared independence from Australia, claiming territory straddling the border between the states of New South Wales and Queensland. Australia's Attorney General's Department indicated it did not consider the declaration to have any meaning in law.

In 2014, another Indigenous group describing itself as the Sovereign Yidindji Government declared independence from Australia.

Unlike in other parts of the former British Empire, like the Treaty of Waitangi in New Zealand, no treaty has ever been concluded between Indigenous Australians and an Australian government. However, although there is still no move toward a treaty at federal level, it is contended that the Noongar Settlement (South West Native Title Settlement) in Western Australia in 2016 constitutes a treaty, and at the state and territory levels there are currently (early 2018) other negotiations and preparatory legislation. In South Australia, however, following the 2018 state election negotiations have been "paused". In June 2018, the Parliament of Victoria passed a bill to advance the process of establishing a treaty with Aboriginal Victorians. The Victorian First Peoples' Assembly was elected in November 2019 and sat for the first time on 10 December 2019.

Prominent Indigenous Australians 

After the arrival of European settlers in New South Wales, some Indigenous Australians became translators and go-betweens; the best-known was Bennelong, who eventually adopted European dress and customs and travelled to England where he was reportedly presented to King George III. Others, such as Pemulwuy, Yagan, and Windradyne, became famous for armed resistance to the European settlers.

During the twentieth century, as social attitudes shifted and interest in Indigenous culture increased, there were more opportunities for Indigenous Australians to gain recognition. Albert Namatjira became a painter, and actors such as David Gulpilil, Ernie Dingo, and Deborah Mailman became well known. Bands such as Yothu Yindi, and singers Christine Anu, Jessica Mauboy and Geoffrey Gurrumul Yunupingu, have combined Indigenous musical styles and instruments with pop/rock, gaining appreciation amongst non-Indigenous audiences. Polymath David Unaipon is commemorated on the Australian $50 note.

While relatively few Indigenous Australians have been elected to political office (Neville Bonner, Aden Ridgeway, Ken Wyatt, Nova Peris, Jacqui Lambie and Linda Burney remain the only Indigenous Australians to have been elected to the Australian Federal Parliament), Aboriginal rights campaigner Sir Douglas Nicholls was appointed Governor of the State of South Australia in 1976, and many others have become famous through political activism – for instance, Charles Perkins' involvement in the Freedom Ride of 1965 and subsequent work; or Torres Strait Islander Eddie Mabo's part in the landmark native title decision that bears his name. The voices of Cape York activists Noel Pearson and Jean Little, and academics Marcia Langton and Mick Dodson, today loom large in national debates. Some Indigenous people who initially became famous in other spheres – for instance, poet Oodgeroo Noonuccal – have used their celebrity to draw attention to Indigenous issues.

In health services, Kelvin Kong became the first Indigenous surgeon in 2006 and is an advocate of Indigenous health issues.

See also 

 Aboriginal Australians
 Aboriginal deaths in custody
 Aboriginal sites of New South Wales
 Animal Management in Rural and Remote Indigenous Communities
 Australian Aboriginal sacred sites
 Australian Indigenous HealthInfoNet
 Australian Institute of Aboriginal and Torres Strait Islander Studies
 Australian outback literature of the 20th century
 Australo-Melanesian
 Customary law in Australia
 Domestic violence in Australia#Indigenous Australians
 Indigenous Protected Area
 IndigenousX, media platform
 List of Indigenous Australian firsts
 List of laws concerning Indigenous Australians
 NAIDOC Week
 Repatriation and reburial of human remains
 Slavery in Australia
 Welcome to country

Notes

Citations

Sources

PDF of original version

 Text may have been copied from this source, which is available under a Attribution 4.0 International (CC BY 4.0) licence. (See here.

 Attribution 4.0 International (CC BY 4.0) licence.

. Dhakiyarr is named "Tuckiar" in the proceedings and is referred to in the main judgment as "a completely uncivilised aboriginal native". The decision was unanimous and strongly criticised the conduct of the trial. Division 4AA..

"Some individuals are close to the Oceanic cluster, composed of MEL and PAP individuals but most occupy a wide range on PC2 between Europeans and East Asians, generally falling in an area occupied by Central and South Asian populations."

Recognising Aboriginal and Torres Strait Islander Peoples in the Constitution: Report of the Expert Panel 

. Dhakiyarr is named "Tuckiar" in the proceedings and is referred to in the main judgment as "a completely uncivilised aboriginal native". The decision was unanimous and strongly criticised the conduct of the trial.

Further reading

 Includes concise summary of referendum, plus detailed section on Legislative Background, starting with the 1891 National Australasian Convention. Tabs to other pages include a long list of Resources and a guide to sources relating to the movement for constitutional recognition of Indigenous Australians.

  NOTE: Updates to 798,400 people, or 3.3% of the population, includes reasons for 19% increase in the population estimate on 30 June 2011.

External links

Articles containing video clips
 
Members of the Unrepresented Nations and Peoples Organization